Joonas Nikolai Kylmäkorpi (born 14 February 1980) is a Finnish former motorcycle speedway rider and is a four times Long Track World Champion.

Career
Nicknamed the Flying Finn, he represented Finland in the Speedway World Cup and won a bronze medal at the Finnish Individual Speedway Championship in 2002.

However, his real success has come on the longtrack where he won four World Championships in 2010, 2011, 2012 and 2013

Speedway Grand Prix results

Speedway honours
 Individual World Championship (Speedway Grand Prix):
 2003 – 40th place (3 points in 2 events)
 2004 – 42nd place (1 points in 1 event)
 Individual U-21 World Championship:
 2000 – 12th place (5 points)
 Team World Championship (Speedway World Cup):
 2001 – 9th place (7 points in qualifying round 1)
 2002 – 8th place (4 points in race-off)
 2003 – 7th place (6 points in race-off)
 2006 – 7th place (did not start in final tournament – 12 points in qualifying round 1)
 2007 – 8th place (6 points in Semi-Final 1)
 2006 European Pairs Speedway Championship:
 2006 – winner of semi-final 2 (10 points in semi-final 2)

World Longtrack Championship

Grand-Prix years
 2000 6pts (22nd overall)
 2005 53pts (4th)
 2006 58pts (Second)
 2007 48pts (Second)
 2008 33pts (10th)
 2009 74pts (7th)
 2010 140pts (CHAMPION)
 2011 127pts (CHAMPION)
 2012 149pts (CHAMPION)
 2013 126pts (CHAMPION)
 2014 66pts (Third)
 2015 46pts (7th).

Best Grand-Prix results
  Eenrum First 2015; Third 2010.
  Forssa First 2010, 2012, Second 2013.
  Forus First 2012, 2013, Second 2011.
  Herxheim First 2015.
  Marmande First 2010, 2012, Second 2011, Third 2007.
  Mühldorf First 2014.
  Pfarrkirchen Second 2010.
  St. Macaire First 2010, Second 2007, 2008.
  Vechta First 2010, 2012, Second 2011, 2013, Third 2009.

Team championship
 2009  Eenrum (6th) 13/31pts (Rode with Rene Lehtinen, Kaj Laukkanen, Aki Pekka Mustonen)
 2010  Morizes (5th) 15/24pts (Rode with Rene Lehtinen, Pasi Pulliainen, Aki Pekka Mustonen)

European Grasstrack Championship
Finalist
2000  Saint-Colomb-de-Lauzun 15pts (5th overall).

See also
 Finland national speedway team
 List of Speedway Grand Prix riders

Notes

1980 births
Living people
Finnish speedway riders
Lakeside Hammers riders
Wolverhampton Wolves riders
Eastbourne Eagles riders
Coventry Bees riders
Sportspeople from Stockholm